Clock were an English band primarily led by Stu Allan and Pete Pritchard and fronted by rapper Marcus Thomas (using the name ODC MC) and vocalist Lorna Saunders (using the name Tinka), though the single "Keep the Fires Burning" was sung by Georgia Lewis. They resembled many Eurodance acts of the time with a female singer and male rapper. Their earlier work was harder, similar to Cappella, but once they started releasing covers, their sound became more dance/pop oriented. Thomas left in 1998 to join the band Tzant, to be replaced by Ché-gun Peters.

They had a string of top 40 hits with nine covers during the 1990s on the UK Singles Chart. They also released hardcore versions of their hits under the name Visa. Clock broke up in 1999 due to a number of personal reasons; they were not able to continue at the same pace as they had before.

In 2004, Saunders appeared on BBC Television's Never Mind the Buzzcocks in the celebrity line-up. It was announced that she was now working as a legal secretary. In 2015, it was revealed that Saunders works as a lawyer for Jackamans and is married with two children.

Discography

Albums

Singles

References

External links
 Lorna Saunders on LinkedIn
 Jackamans Solicitors
 
 

English dance music groups
English pop music groups
English house music groups
British Eurodance groups
Musical groups established in 1993
Musical groups disestablished in 1999
Musical groups from Manchester
1993 establishments in England
1999 disestablishments in England